This is a List of USA Cup Winners. The USA Cup is an annual floorball open event. Floorball is a type of floor hockey first played in the late 1960s.

See also
USA Cup (floorball)
Canada Cup (floorball)
Czech Open (floorball)
List of Czech Open winners

External links
USA Cup Website

Floorball in the United States
Floorball competitions